Gnoien is a small town in the Rostock district, in Mecklenburg-Western Pomerania, Germany. It is situated 40 km southeast of Rostock.

Famous people

 Bernd Olbricht (born 1956), canoeist.

 Friedrich Heyser (1857 - 1921), German portrait, landscape, and history painter.

References

Cities and towns in Mecklenburg
Populated places established in the 13th century
1290s establishments in the Holy Roman Empire
1290 establishments in Europe
Grand Duchy of Mecklenburg-Schwerin